Ramendra Kumar (Ramen) is an Indian author of children’s books with 35 books in English. They are also available in 15 Indian languages and 14 foreign languages. He has also written satire, poetry, travelogues, adult fiction, and non-fiction.

Biography 
Ramen was born in Hyderabad. He attended Hyderabad Public School, Begumpet. After completing his Engineering and MBA, he moved to Rourkela where he got a job in Rourkela Steel Plant. His daughter Ankita, sons Aniket and Labrador Aryan are bonsai celebrities in their own right.

Writing career 
Ramen commenced by writing satire and poetry but once his daughter started pestering him for stories, he shifted to children's fiction. Ramen's first book for children came out in 1997. Since then his work has been published by Penguin, Duckbill Hachette, Pratham, National Book Trust (NBT), Rupa & Co., Children's Book Trust (CBT), Navneet, Readomania, Pauline & Ponytale.  His stories have been included in ten anthologies brought out by CBT as well as collections brought out by AWIC, Vikas, Pustak Mahal, Readomania and Blue Pencil. His stories have also been published in the 'Chicken Soup for the Soul Series.'

Ramen's work has been published and reviewed in major newspapers and magazines. One of his stories has been included in the text book for class 9 students of Norway while another story has been adapted as Kamishibai, the traditional form of storytelling in Japan. His stories have also found a place in 15 textbooks for schools following CBSE and ICSE and State Boards as well as in the curriculum in schools abroad. Six of his books have been recommended by Central Board of Secondary Education (CBSE), India, as Supplementary Readers. His read-aloud book Paplu the Giant was selected for story telling sessions to mark the International Literacy Day, by its publisher Pratham. On 7 September 2013 the story was narrated in more than 25 languages in 27 states across the country as well as abroad. Paplu the Giant has also been brought out as an audio book by "Radio Mirchi" in five languages as a part of its CSR initiative 'Mirchi Cares'. The book  has been distributed by Pratham in collaboration with National Association for the Blind. Department of Education, Government of Sri Lanka has published a text book for students of Grade 5 which will be distributed free of cost to 3.2 lakh children in the island country.

His adaptation of Juvenile Justice Act, 2006 in a Graphic Book format was endorsed by United Nations Office on Drugs and Crime (UNODC). His graphic book on diabetes was published by Butterflies, an NGO involved with homeless and working children.

Ramen has also written several travelogues, satires, and articles on relationships and parenting issues which have been published on- and offline. His research based literary pieces have found a place in different anthologies. Ramen has also written several literary pieces which have been published in different anthologies.

The first edition of his maiden book for adults Mohini, was sold out in the very first week of its release. His first book of non-fiction, Effective Parenting: A New Paradigm, has received an excellent response and is in its second reprint.

An inspirational speaker and storyteller, Ramen has been invited to participate in several festivals including Sharjah Children’s Reading Festival, Jaipur Literature Festival, Hyderabad Literary Festival,  Bookaroo, Bhubaneswar Festival of Storytelling (BhuFesto), Chandigarh Children's Literature Festival etc. as well as seminars organised by Sahitya Akademi, IGNOU and NBT among others. He presented a paper at the 31st IBBY World Congress held in Copenhagen, Denmark in 2008. He chaired two sessions at the 36th IBBY World Congress held in Aug-Sept. 2018, the only Indian writer to do so. Ramen has also conducted Creative Writing sessions in Denmark, Kenya & Sri Lanka.

Awards and accolades 

Ramen won 5 prizes in the ‘Competition for Writers of Children’s Books, 2016 (English) organized by CBT. Ramen was also felicitated by the writers and publishers of Sri Lanka for his significant contribution to children’s literature, in December 2017.

Ramen was  conferred the ‘Hall of Fame’ award by Public Relations Council of India (PRCI) in March 2020.

Bibliography 
 JUST A SECOND AND OTHER STORIES (1997) – Vikas Publishing House, Pvt. ltd., New Delhi
 THE MAGIC PILLS AND OTHER STORIES (1999)- Vikas Publishing House, Pvt. ltd., New Delhi
 THE WILL TO WIN (2001) –Dahlia Publishers Pvt. Ltd., Kerala
 INTERNET IN THE JUNGLE AND OTHER STORIES (2003)- Sanbun Publishers, New Delhi.
 THE MAD SCIENTIST AND OTHER STORIES (2004) – Rupa & Co., New Delhi
 CHECK AND MATE AND OTHER STORIES (2004) – Rupa & Co., New Delhi
 THE MIRACLE PARK (2004) – Dahlia Publishers Pvt Ltd., Kerala
 BABOLITO AND OTHER FANTASIES (2005) – Navneet Publications (India) Ltd., Mumbai
 NOT A MERE GAME AND OTHER STORIES (2006) – Navneet Publications (India) Ltd., Mumbai
 THE BRAVE FRIENDS AND OTHER STORIES (2007) – Pauline Publications, Mumbai
 BETTER THAN THE BEST (2007) – National Book Trust (NBT), New Delhi
 TERROR IN FUN CITY (NOVEL) (2008) – Navneet Publications (India) Ltd., Mumbai
 THE CACTUS (2009) – National Book Trust (NBT), New Delhi
 FOLK TALES OF ORISSA (2009) – Children's Book Trust (CBT), New Delhi
 JUVENILE JUSTICE ACT (Graphic Book) (2010) - Butterflies, New Delhi
 NOW OR NEVER (NOVEL) (2010)- Ponytale Books, New Delhi
 PAPLU THE GIANT (2011) – Pratham Books, Bengaluru
 BRAVE NIRMAL AND OTHER STORIES (2012) – Pauline Publications, Mumbai
 WHAT, WHY AND HOW - A GRAPHIC BOOK ON DIABETES (2012) - Butterflies, New Delhi
 A TALE OF TAILS (2013) – National Book Trust (NBT), New Delhi
 WE ARE DIFFERENT (2013) – National Book Trust (NBT), New Delhi
 THE ROYAL SWEEPERS (2013) – National Book Trust (NBT), New Delhi
 BOOND (2013) – National Book Trust (NBT), New Delhi
 MOHINI (2014) – Bluejay Books Pvt. Ltd, New Delhi
 EFFECTIVE PARENTING: A NEW PARADIGM (2014) - learningandcreativity.com
 TALES OF LORD JAGANNATH (2014) - B.K.Publications Pvt. Ltd., Bhubaneswar
 THE INDIAN MASAAI (2015) - Frog Books, Mumbai
 INTEHA : Gazal. Geet. (Hindi)(2015) – Authors’ Ink Publications, New Delhi www.authorsinkindia.com
 THE PERFECT MATCH(2015) - Pratham Books, Bengaluru
 AND THE JHELUM FLOWS (2016) - Authors’ Ink Publications,New Delhi 
 A TSUNAMI CALLED NANI (2016) - Mango Books, Kochi
AGAINST ALL ODDS (2017) – Duckbill  Books, New Delhi
A SPECIAL ACT  (2017 ) –  A Comic Book on POCSO Act, Butterflies, New Delhi
APJ ABDUL KALAM (2018)  - A Scientist & A Sage - B.K.Publications Pvt. Ltd., Bhubaneswar
THE SIEGE OF CRICKET (2018 )–  Readomania Publishing (2018), New Delhi
DILIP TIRKEY : An Authorized Biography  (2018) – Paschima Publications, Bhubaneswar
DIFFERENT SHADES OF  EVE – Woven Words Publishers (2019)
STORIES OF RESILIENCE (2019) – Protsahan Foundation, New Delhi

See also
 List of Indian writers

References 

 http://www.learningandcreativity.com/mohini-implosion-brightest-star/
 http://indiatoday.intoday.in/story/volunteer-to-tell-a-story/1/312661.html
 https://soundcloud.com/prathambooks/paplu-the-giant-english
 http://www.ibby.org/index.php?id=937
 
 
 http://www.papertigers.org/wordpress/guest-post-ramendra-kumar-on-the-here-and-now-in-childrens-literature-2/
 http://nathaliemvondo.wordpress.com/2011/05/25/foreign-books-worth-knowing-now-or-never-by-ramendra
 
 http://www.thehindu.com/todays-paper/tp-in-school/storytelling-sparks-creativity-in-children-writer-ramen/article8577128.ece
 http://indiatoday.intoday.in/story/busy-corporate-turned-popular-writer-moots-interactive/1/661955.html
 http://www.business-standard.com/article/pti-stories/busy-corporate-turned-popular-writer-moots-interactive-116050800263_1.html
http://www.thehindu.com/todays-paper/tp-in-school/storytelling-sparks-creativity-in-children-writer-ramen/article8577128

External links 

 
 
 
 

Living people
Indian children's writers
Indian male novelists
Indian male poets
Indian satirists
Year of birth missing (living people)